Mohamed Deriche, (born 1865 in Souk El-Had, Boumerdès Province, Kabylie, Algeria; died 1948 in Boudouaou, Algeria) was an Algerian Berber politician after the French conquest of Algeria.

Presentation 
Mohamed Deriche was born in the Kabyle  of Aïth Hamadouche in 1865.

The Aïth Hamadouche are a  whose village is located on the eastern part of the Khachna mountain range and overlooks Oued Isser.

His father was Ali Deriche, a farmer in Beni Amrane, and his grandfather was Mohamed Deriche, former Zouave.

This name Deriche is either a modification of the Arabic name Dervish, or a meaning of French opulence "De Riche".

Caïdat 

He was thus a Qaid of the Khachna who was a part of the Menerville district.

Qaid Mohamed Deriche was a member of the municipal council of Ménerville and was assisted by an indigenous council of municipal councilors whose members were Rabah Maref, Dahmane Deriche, Rabah Timizar, Hocine Fazez, Mohamed Amraoui, Lounès Deriche and Ahmed Deriche.

This Qaid attended the administrative, electoral and festive meetings which took place at the level of the town hall of Ménerville in 1931 and 1932.

Mohamed Deriche had to collaborate with the mayors César Boniface and Jérôme Zévaco.

Activities 

The Qaid Mohamed Deriche watched peace and serenity in the douars of Khachna.

Mohamed Deriche and Sheikh Mohamed Seghir Boushaki, under the guardianship of the Clerk of the Peace of the Ménerville court, were helped by French agents and were able to elucidate many harassments and misdemeanors.

Properties 
Mohamed Deriche has One of these properties located in Beni Amrane was specialized in cattle breeding (French: élevage bovin) where the crossing of bulls and heifers aimed at the improvement of animal breeds. This farm of Beni Amrane received the  several times. The vermeil medal was awarded in 1913 to the father of Mohamed Deriche who counted more than 30 years of agricultural services since 1880.

Nationalist Movement 

Due to his political position, Mohamed Deriche had a privileged relationship with the  since its creation in 1931.

He received Mohamed Bachir El Ibrahimi at his home in Ménerville and accompanied him to the Zawiya of Aïth Hamadouche in the heights of Souk El-Had in the pass of Aïth Aïcha to receive the reforming councils in religion and politics. The Imam khatib who preached this Zawiya was Mohamed Boushaki (1876–1950), whose uncle Mohamed Seghir Boushaki (1869–1959) was Sheikh El Ferka of the Aïth Aïcha and a municipal councilor of the town hall of Ménerville.

Algerian War 
Lyès Deriche, who housed in his villa in the Algerian commune of Clos-Salembier the meeting of the Group of 22 baptized Revolutionary Committee of Unity and Action (RCUA). is related to him .

On 25 July 1954, in the modest villa belonging to Elias Deriche, twenty-two Algerians spoke for the unlimited revolution until total independence. They were all elders of the Special Organization who were summoned in the second half of June 1954.

He welcomed Mohamed Boudiaf who was the revolutionary leader of Algiers, and had prepared the meal for the participants in the historic meeting.

About noon the owner of the house, Deriche, invited the presents to a couscous, and after a short pause they returned to work.

Independent Algeria 
The son of Mohamed Deriche, Dahmane Deriche, was appointed to represent the former commune of Souk El-Had in the special delegation responsible for the new commune of Ménerville after the proclamation of Algerian independence in 1962.

Dahman previously ran a farm in Souk El-Had and maintained an intimate relationship with the Algerian National Movement.

It was by the decree of 21 August 1962, published in the  that the prefect of Algiers  appointed Dahmane Deriche to this administrative post.

See also 

 Algerian nationalism
 Algerian National Movement
 French Third Republic
 French Fourth Republic
 History of Algeria
 List of Algerians
 Cheikh Mokrani

References

External links
 www.thenia.net" about Thénia
 http://menerville.free.fr about "Ménerville and Thénia" before 1962
 http://menerville2.free.fr about "Ménerville and Thénia" before 1962

1865 births
People from Souk El-Had
People from Thénia District
People from Boumerdès Province
Kabyle people
1948 deaths
Burials in Algeria
20th-century Algerian politicians
Algerian Berber politicians
Algerian nationalism